Panagiotis Alexandris (born 15 August 1949) is a Greek alpine skier. He competed in two events at the 1972 Winter Olympics.

References

External links

1949 births
Living people
Greek male alpine skiers
Olympic alpine skiers of Greece
Alpine skiers at the 1972 Winter Olympics
Place of birth missing (living people)